Tomasz Sokołowski (born 21 September 1970 in Gdynia) is a former Polish footballer.

Career
He began his career with MOSiR Pruszcz Gdański (fall 1990) upon completing high school. He began playing at MOSiR Pruszcz Gdański in 1980 as a youth. He then moved on to Łyn Sępopol (1991). In 1992, he transferred to Stomil Olsztyn and helped them advance to the Ekstraklasa in 1994.

Starting in 1996 he landed with Legia Warsaw. He made his debut for Legia in a Champions League quarterfinal against Panathinaikos on March 8, 1996. He played at Legia until 2005 (with a brief stint at Maccabi Netanya in 2001). While at Legia he won the Polish championship in 2002, Polish Cup and Super Cup in 1997.

In the summer of 2005 he moved on to Górnik Łęczna and made 23 appearances in 2005-2006 . A year later before the 2006/2007 season he transferred to Ruch Chorzów and helped them advance to the Orange Ekstraklasa. He finished his career with Jagiellonia Białystok in 2008.

He has appeared in 12 games for Poland and scored 1 goal.

Successes
Legia Warsaw
 1x Polish Champion: 2001/02
 1x Polish Cup: 1996/97
 1x Polish SuperCup: 1997
 1x Ekstraklasa Cup: 2002

References

External links
  
 

1970 births
Association football midfielders
Górnik Łęczna players
Legia Warsaw players
Living people
Maccabi Netanya F.C. players
Expatriate footballers in Israel
Sportspeople from Gdynia
Polish footballers
Poland international footballers
Ruch Chorzów players
OKS Stomil Olsztyn players
Jagiellonia Białystok players